The anabaritids or angustiochreids are enigmatic tubular, mineralizing organisms with a trifold symmetry (i.e., clover shape) known from their Lower Cambrian fossils.  They may have represented cnidaria, but their affinity within the Metazoa is difficult to constrain.

References

Cambrian animals